The Special Without Brett Davis is a public-access television show on Manhattan Neighborhood Network. The show takes the form of an ever-changing live "special" with a new format and performers, and a host portrayed by comedian Brett Davis.

The show adopted the Wednesday night 11pm timeslot previously held by The Chris Gethard Show after it moved to cable.

Contributors 

The show features a rotating cast of comedians in varying roles week to week, in character or as themselves.

Past contributors include Jo Firestone, Chris Gethard, John Early, Ana Fabrega, Julio Torres, Anna Drezen, Bridey Elliott, Conner O'Malley, Joe Pera, Josh Gondelman, Cole Escola, James Adomian, Patti Harrison, Sunita Mani, Tallie Medel, Ziwe Fumudoh, John Reynolds, Anna Drezen, Dan Licata, Spike Einbinder, Nick Naney, River Ramirez, Colin Burgess, Mary Houlihan, Joe Rumrill, Steve Whalen ("Mr. Jokes"), Russell Dolan (“Mr. Jokes biggest fan”), and Nick “The electrician”.

Guests 

Past interview guests include Gilbert Gottfried, Michael Shannon, Janeane Garofalo, Richard Kind, Brian Stack, Dave Hill, Danny Tamberelli, Meredith Graves, Lita, Jake Fogelnest, New Jack, Tom Scharpling, Adam Richman, Dave Meltzer, Jean Grae, Scott Rogowsky, Dalton Castle, Chapo Trap House, Logan Miller, Kevin Corrigan, Lloyd Kaufman, Artie Lange, Rose McGowan, Dasha Nekrasova, Karley Sciortino, Alex Brightman, Jesse Camp, Tim Williams and Marnie the Dog.

Musical guests have included Jerry Paper, The Thermals, Screaming Females, Emily Wells, Sunflower Bean, Mr Twin Sister, Guerilla Toss, M Lamar, Lushlife, Tredici Bacci, Dougie Poole, Ava Luna, Domino Kirke, SAVAK, A Place To Bury Strangers, Jazzboy, Long Neck, The Vandelles, Showtime Goma and more.

Episodes

References

English-language television shows
American public access television
American public access television shows
Television shows filmed in New York City